Michael Fabián Ríos Ripoll (born 24 April 1985) is a Chilean footballer who plays as a right midfielder.

Club career
Ríos began his career in Santiago Morning aged 17, then joining to powerhouse club Católica in 2012, having prior spells at Deportes Iquique and San Marcos de Arica, eternal rivals at the country's northern zone.

In 2021, he signed with Chilean Segunda Profesional side Lautaro de Buin, but the team could only play in the Copa Chile.

Controversies
The player Michael Rios is now being processed by the Chilean judicial system due to his participation in the robbery of a truck full of nuts. His manager referred to the incident expressing that "At the beginning people were talking about drug trafficking, that's not Michael style. He was just offered nuts."

Honours

Club
Colo-Colo
Primera División (1): 2017–T
Copa Chile: 2016
Supercopa de Chile: 2017

References

External links
 
 Ceroacero Profile
 

1985 births
Living people
Footballers from Santiago
Chilean footballers
Chile international footballers
Santiago Morning footballers
San Marcos de Arica footballers
Deportes Iquique footballers
Club Deportivo Universidad Católica footballers
Colo-Colo footballers
Rangers de Talca footballers
Independiente de Cauquenes footballers
San Antonio Unido footballers
Lautaro de Buin footballers
Deportes Melipilla footballers
Chilean Primera División players
Primera B de Chile players
Segunda División Profesional de Chile players
Association football midfielders